Kowloondocks was a British steam powered tugboat that sunk in 1962 in Victoria Harbour during Typhoon Wanda with all 30 crew members lost.

Ships lost with all hands
Ships of the United Kingdom
Shipwrecks of Hong Kong
Maritime incidents in 1962
Tugboats
1962 in Hong Kong